This article lists some of the longest words in the French language.

As in many languages, chemical nomenclature may be used to construct indefinitely long chemical names (if referring to fictional molecules), and therefore is not on this list. The chemical name of titin could be translated, and therefore would be the longest technical word in the French language.

The longest word listed below, hippopotomonstrosesquippedaliophobie (36 letters) is the fear (or phobia) of long words. The word is formed from the Latin word sesquipedalia (singular sesquipedalis), which the Ancient Roman poet Horace used in Ars Poetica to describe excessively long words; literally, it means "a foot-and-a-half long". 

Like the other phobias in the list,  can be pluralised by adding the letter s to the end. The adjective interdépartemental (18 letters), which also appears in the list, can be made longer by appending the letters es , which gives its plural, grammatically gendered form.

Long words

See also

 Longest words
 Longest word in English
 Longest word in Romanian
 Longest word in Spanish
 Longest word in Turkish

Notes

References
 

French words and phrases
Word in French
French